Michael Cohen (1951–1997) was an American singer-songwriter from New York City. He released three albums in the 1970s which were among the first to deal with explicitly gay themes. Cohen was licensed as a cab driver in New York City in 1972.

Work and influences
Cohen self-released his first album, eponymously titled Mike Cohen, in 1972. This was followed by two albums on Folkways Records, What Did You Expect? (Folkways Records FS 8582, 1973) and Some of Us Had to Live (Folkways Records FS 8582, 1976). The latter two are available from Smithsonian Folkways. Cohen was influenced by Bob Dylan and Leonard Cohen. "The Last Angry Young Man", which opens What did You Expect?, deals with the misconceptions around homosexuality of the older generation while "Gone", from the same album, deals sensitively with the death of a gay friend. Frieze Magazine describes Cohen's "Bitterfeast" from the same album as a "raw and chokingly emotional" ballad based on a poem by Leonard Cohen. After releasing a third album, Cohen "dropped off the radar" until his death in 1997.

Discography
 Mike Cohen (1972)
 What Did You Expect? (1973) Discographic details from Smithsonian Institution
 Some of Us Had To Live (1976) Discographic details from Smithsonian Institution

References

External links
 Cohen sources http://queermusicheritage.com/jun2005mc.html
 JD Doyle, June 2005 radio transcript to the show Queer Music Heritage, http://www.queermusicheritage.com/jun2005s.html
 Materials from Folkways Records held by Rinzler Folklife Archives at the Smithsonian Institution

American LGBT musicians
LGBT people from New York (state)
American folk singers
Singers from New York City
American male singer-songwriters
1951 births
1997 deaths
20th-century American singers
20th-century American male singers
20th-century American LGBT people
Singer-songwriters from New York (state)